Martín Zubimendi Ibáñez (born 2 February 1999) is a Spanish professional footballer who plays as a midfielder for La Liga club Real Sociedad and the Spain national team.

Club career
Born in San Sebastián, Gipuzkoa, Basque Country, Zubimendi joined Real Sociedad's youth setup in 2011, aged 12. He made his senior debut with the C-team on 27 August 2016, playing the last seven minutes in a 0–0 Tercera División home draw against SCD Durango.

On 25 July 2018, Zubimendi renewed his contract until 2022, and was definitely promoted to the reserves in Segunda División B. The following 28 April, he made his first team – and La Liga – debut, coming on as a late substitute for Rubén Pardo in a 2–1 home win over Getafe CF.

On 24 July 2020, Zubimendi renewed his contract with the Txuri-urdin until 2025, being definitively promoted to the main squad.

International career
Zubimendi represented the Spain under-19s in a friendly 2–1 loss to the Portugal under-19s on 15 November 2017.

Due to the isolation of some national team players following the positive COVID-19 test of Sergio Busquets, Spain's under-21 squad were called up for the international friendly against Lithuania on 8 June 2021. Zubimendi made his senior debut in the match.

Career statistics

Club

International

Honours
Real Sociedad
Copa del Rey: 2019–20

Spain U23
Summer Olympic silver medal: 2020

References

External links
 Real Sociedad profile 
 
 
 

1999 births
Living people
Spanish footballers
Footballers from San Sebastián
Association football midfielders
La Liga players
Segunda División B players
Tercera División players
Real Sociedad C footballers
Real Sociedad B footballers
Real Sociedad footballers
Spain youth international footballers
Spain under-21 international footballers
Spain international footballers
Olympic footballers of Spain
Footballers at the 2020 Summer Olympics
Olympic medalists in football
Olympic silver medalists for Spain
Medalists at the 2020 Summer Olympics